Daniel Doyle (16 September 1864 – 9 April 1918) was a Scottish footballer who played for among others, East Stirlingshire, Hibernian, Sunderland Albion, Grimsby Town (where a collision with opponent William Cropper in an 1889 match led to the other player's death - an inquest cleared Doyle of any wrongdoing), Bolton Wanderers, Everton (where he partnered Andrew Hannah in defence as the club won their first Football League title in 1890–91), Celtic (where he won four Scottish Football League championships – becoming the first player to win a league title on both sides of the border), and the Scotland national team.

He won a total of eight caps for Scotland between 1892 and 1898, and also represented the Scottish League XI ten times.

He died from cancer at his home in Glasgow in April 1918.

See also
List of Scotland national football team captains

References

External links
 

1864 births
1918 deaths
Scottish footballers
Footballers from Paisley, Renfrewshire
Scottish people of Irish descent
Scotland international footballers
East Stirlingshire F.C. players
Hibernian F.C. players
Sunderland Albion F.C. players
Grimsby Town F.C. players
Bolton Wanderers F.C. players
Everton F.C. players
Celtic F.C. players
English Football League players
Scottish Football League players
Scottish Football League representative players
Association football fullbacks
Deaths from cancer in Scotland